Edmond Island is an island in the Detroit River located in the city of Gibraltar, Michigan, in the United States.

References

Islands of Wayne County, Michigan
Islands of the Detroit River
River islands of Michigan
Michigan populated places on the Detroit River